Haw Creek Township is one of twenty-one townships in Knox County, Illinois, USA.  As of the 2010 census, its population was 461 and it contained 193 housing units.  Its name was changed from Ohio township on June 8, 1853.

Geography

Cities, towns, villages
 Maquon (north edge)

Unincorporated towns
 Gilson at

Cemeteries
The township contains these five cemeteries: Clark Chapel, Gilson, Harshbarger, Maquon and Russell.

Demographics

School districts
 Farmington Central Community Unit School District 265
 Knoxville Community Unit School District 202
 Spoon River Valley Community Unit School District 4

Political districts
 Illinois's 17th congressional district
 State House District 74
 State Senate District 37

References
 
 United States Census Bureau 2009 TIGER/Line Shapefiles
 United States National Atlas

External links
 City-Data.com
 Illinois State Archives
 Township Officials of Illinois

Townships in Knox County, Illinois
Galesburg, Illinois micropolitan area
Townships in Illinois